The following is a list of all heavy rail rapid transit systems in the United States. It does not include statistics for bus or light rail systems (see: List of United States light rail systems by ridership for the latter). All ridership figures represent "unlinked" passenger trips (i.e. line transfers on multi-line systems register as separate trips). The data is provided by the American Public Transportation Association's Ridership Reports.

See also

List of metro systems
List of North American rapid transit systems by ridership
List of tram and light rail transit systems
List of suburban and commuter rail systems
List of United States light rail systems by ridership
List of North American light rail systems by ridership
List of United States commuter rail systems by ridership
List of United States local bus agencies by ridership

Notes

References

 
Rapid transit systems